Errol Campbell Andrew (born 13 December 1940 in Palmerston North, New Zealand) is a former speedway rider and jockey. During his career as a jockey he rode as E. C. Andrew, but when he was riding speedway he was known as Bill Andrew.

Speedway career
Andrew began riding at the Palmerston North Showgrounds track in 1961.  He rode  for the Newcastle Diamonds in the Provincial League in 1962 and 1964.  He rode in the British League for the Poole Pirates from 1965 to 1968. He then had two years with the Newport Wasps. His final season was with the Halifax Dukes.

He rode in two British Championship finals in 1965 and 1968 and was a member of the 1966 Great Britain team for a home and away test series with Poland. In 1966 he also rode in the Wills Internationale and the British League Riders' Championship. He was runnerup in the 1970 New Zealand Championship.  From 1962 to 1973 he rode for New Zealand in team competitions in the United Kingdom and at home.

Horse racing career 

Andrew rode as a jockey in New Zealand and in England. When he was living in Somerset in the early 1970s he rode in steeplechase events for the Kennard Organisation.
He also rode for John Richards and Stan Wright.

References 

1940 births
Living people
New Zealand speedway riders
Newcastle Diamonds riders
Poole Pirates riders
Newport Wasps riders
Halifax Dukes riders
Sportspeople from Palmerston North